Dörfler is a surname. Notable people with the name include:

Emese Dörfler-Antal (born 1971), Austrian speed skater
Fabian Dörfler (born 1983), German slalom canoeist
Ferdinand Dörfler (1903–1965), German screenwriter and film director
Gerhard Dörfler (born 1955), Austrian politician
Wolfgang Kreissl-Dörfler (born 1950), German politician and Member of the European Parliament

See also
Doerfler